The Nord 2100 Norazur was a 1940s French military transport monoplane designed and built at Courbevoie near Paris by SNCAN.

Design and development
The Norazur was a high-wing cantilever monoplane with a retractable tricycle landing gear. Powered by two wing-mounted Potez piston engines in pusher configuration. It had an enclosed cabin for ten passengers or freight.

Designed to meet a post-war requirement for a light transport and training aircraft the Norazur first flew at Les Mureaux on 30 April 1947. An additional prototype with  Béarn 6D-07 engines is believed to have been built. With other similar designs available the type did not enter production.

Variants
N2100
Prototype light transport with two  Potez 8D-03 inverted, air-cooled V-8 piston engines in pusher configuration, one built.
N2101
Prototype with alternate  Béarn 6D-07 inverted, air-cooled  V-6 piston engines in pusher configuration, believed to have been built.
N2102
Projected variant with two SNECMA 12S engines in tractor configuration.

Specifications

References
Notes

Bibliography

Photo of N-2100

1940s French airliners
Norazur
Twin-engined pusher aircraft
High-wing aircraft
Aircraft first flown in 1947